The 1977 European Karate Championships, the 12th edition of the European Karate Championships, was held in the sports complex of Coubertine Hall in Paris, France from May 2 to 4, 1977.

Competition

Team kumite

References

1977
International sports competitions hosted by France
European Karate Championships
European championships in 1977
International sports competitions hosted by Paris
European Karate Championships
Karate competitions in France
European Karate Championships